Weaver, or Weaverville, is a former gold mining town, now a deserted ghost town, in Yavapai County, Arizona, United States. All that remains are some rusting mining machinery, a partially restored cemetery, and the ruins of a stone house.

History

The town of Weaverville was established shortly after the discovery of placer gold deposits on nearby Rich Hill in May 1863.  The town was named after mountain man Pauline Weaver, who worked as a guide for the group of prospectors who made the discovery.  The gold was discovered by a member of the party while chasing a stray donkey. After the placer deposits were exhausted, mining turned to the lode deposits that were the source of the placer gold.

Weaverville, soon shortened to Weaver, came under the control of Francisco Vega and his band of outlaws.  Travelers and businesses avoided Weaver and its outlaw element in favor of the nearby towns of Stanton and Octave.

A post office was established at Weaver on 26 May 1899, but remained less than a year before it moved to nearby Octave on 19 April 1900.

Geography

See also
 List of ghost towns in Arizona

References

External links
 GhostTowns.com profile
 Ghost Town Gallery
 Weaver – Ghost Town of the Month at azghosttowns.com

Ghost towns in Arizona
Former populated places in Yavapai County, Arizona
Boot Hill cemeteries
Cemeteries in Arizona
Mining communities in Arizona
1863 establishments in Arizona Territory